Sa'ir (also spelled Saeer, Seir, or Si'ir) is a Palestinian town in the Hebron Governorate of the State of Palestine, in the southern West Bank, located  northeast of Hebron. Nearby localities include Beit Fajjar and al-Arroub to the north, Beit Ummar to the northwest, Halhul to the west and Beit Einun and ash-Shuyukh to the south. The Dead Sea is just east of Sa'ir's municipal borders. In the 2007 census Palestinian Central Bureau of Statistics, the town had a population of over 18,045.

It has municipal jurisdiction over 117,000 dunams, 6,000 of which is built-up area and 11,715 of which is cultivated. The main economic activities in Sa'ir are agriculture and the Israeli labor market, although the latter has been adversely affected as a result of the Israeli restrictions following the Second Intifada in 2000–04. Olives are the major cash crop.

Name
According to the Applied Research Institute Jerusalem (ARIJ), Sa'ir "was established on the town of Saeer or Saiour", and during the Roman era the town was known as "Sior". The Book of Joshua (15:54) mentions a town in this area called Tsi`or (also transliterated Sior or Zior). The Hebrew name is related to a root meaning "small".

History
Byzantine ceramics have been found. The PEF's Survey of Western Palestine (SWP),  wrote that: "The tomb of El 'Ais (Esau), south of the village, is in a chamber 37 feet east and west by 20 feet north and south, th a Mihrab on the south wall. The tomb is 12 feet long, 3 1/2 feet broad, 5 feet high, covered with a dark green cloth and a canopy above. An ostrich egg is hung near. North of the chamber is a vaulted room of equal size, and to the east is an open court with a fig-tree, and a second cenotaph rudely plastered, said to be that of Esau's slave. Rock-cut tombs exist south-west of this place."

Ottoman era
In 1596 Sa'ir appeared in the Ottoman tax registers as part of the nahiya of Halil in the Liwa of Quds. It had an entirely Muslim population consisting of 72 households. Taxes were paid on wheat, barley, summer crops, olive trees, goats and/or beehives.

The French explorer Victor Guérin visited the village in the 1860s, and found it having about 400 inhabitants. He mentioned a few rock-cut tombs that are still in use; they are locked by a burial stone, and are reopened by locals whenever a new body is buried.

SWP described Sa'ir in 1883 as "a village of moderate size, in a valley surrounded with cultivated ground." A maqam (shrine) located in Sa'ir was believed by the local Muslims to house the tomb of Esau who they referred to as "Aisa." The SWP stated this identification was false and that Esau's tomb was in the Biblical Mount Seir.

Under the name Sa'in, an Ottoman village list of about 1870 indicated 84 houses and a population of 186, though it is proposed that the population count included men, only.

British Mandate period
In the 1922 census of Palestine, conducted  by the British Mandate authorities, Sa'ir had a population of 1,477 inhabitants, all Muslim. In  the 1931 census the population of Si'ir was a total of 1,967, still entirely Muslim, in 388 inhabited houses.

In the  1945 statistics the population of Si'ir was 2,710, all Muslims, who owned 92,423 dunams of land  according to an official land and population survey. 2,483 dunams were plantations and irrigable land, 10,671  for cereals, while 76 dunams were built-up (urban) land.

Jordanian period
In the wake of the 1948 Arab–Israeli War, and after the 1949 Armistice Agreements, Sa'ir came under Jordanian rule.

In 1961, the population of Si'ir was 2,511.

1967 war and aftermath
Sa'ir has been under Israeli occupation since the 1967 Six-Day War. The population in the 1967 census conducted by the Israeli authorities was 4,172.

Following the 1993 Oslo Accords Sa'ir was designated within "Area B" giving the Palestinian National Authority (PNA) control over the town's civil affairs while Israel maintained its control over security. In 1997, an elected 13-member municipal council was established by the PNA to administer Sa'ir. Its municipal borders include a number of small villages, including al-Uddeisa, ad-Duwwara, Irqan Turad, Kuziba, Wadi ar-Rum and Ras at-Tawil. Principal families include Shlaldah, Froukh, Al-Lahaleeh, Jaradat, Mtur, al-Jabarin, al-Kawazbeh, Arameen and al-Turweh. Hakim Shlaldah was elected mayor in the 2005 municipal elections.

In January, 2013, Rafat Jaradat, 30 years old, from Sa'ir, died in jail five days after he was arrested by the Israelis. Israeli sources said his death was caused by "sudden heart attack while under interrogation", while Palestinian officials said that Jaradat had been tortured while in  Israeli detention. His body had bruises and broken ribs, which the Israelis said came from attempts to revive him, while his brother said it looked as if Jaradat had been severely beaten.

Hamas candidates have won election to the town council, which is described in the Israeli press as "Hamas affiliated," and as "having close ties to Hamas."

Between October 2015 and mid January 2016 eleven Sair residents were shot dead by the Israeli army in  alleged attacks on Israeli soldiers. Almost half of them were killed at Beit Einun Junction where the IDF controls access to the town.

References

Bibliography

External links
Welcome To Sa'eer
Sa’ir, Welcome to Palestine
Survey of Western Palestine, Map 21:    IAA, Wikimedia commons
 Sa'ir Town (Fact Sheet),   Applied Research Institute–Jerusalem (ARIJ)
Sa'ir Town Profile, ARIJ
Aerial Photo, ARIJ
Needs for development in Sa'ir town based on the community and local authorities’ assessment, ARIJ
 Israeli Colonists set Olive Trees on Fire in Sa'ir Town   04,  June,   2010,  POICA
Israeli Colonists Plough 20 Dunums of the Town of Sa’ir in Hebron Governorate.   01, January, 2011,  ARIJ
 Israeli Colonists Level Tens of Dunums of Palestinian lands in Sa'ir town- Hebron Governorate   19,  August,  2011,  POICA
 Military Demolition Orders in Sa’ir Village northeast of Hebron City at the Southern parts of the West Bank   20, August, 2011,  POICA

Cities in the West Bank
Hebron Governorate
Municipalities of the State of Palestine